Llanberis railway station may refer to the following railway stations in Llanberis, Wales

Llanberis railway station (London and North Western Railway), a standard gauge station closed in 1964
Llanberis railway station (Llanberis Lake Railway), the southern terminus of the Llanberis Lake Railway
Llanberis railway station (Snowdon Mountain Railway), the lower terminus of the Snowdon Mountain Railway